The men's road time trial at the 2018 Commonwealth Games in Gold Coast, Australia was held on 10 April along the Currumbin Beachfront.

Schedule
The schedule was as follows:

All times are Australian Eastern Standard Time (UTC+10)

Results
The results were as follows:

References

Men's road time trial
2018 in men's road cycling
Road cycling at the Commonwealth Games